Thai eggplant is the name for several varieties of eggplant used in Southeast Asian cuisines, most often of the eggplant species Solanum melongena. They are also cultivated in India and Sri Lanka and feature in Sri Lankan cuisine. These golf ball sized eggplants are commonly used in Thai cuisine, Indonesian cuisine, and in Cambodian Cuisine. Some of the cultivars in Thailand are Thai Purple, Thai Green, Thai Yellow, and Thai White.

Uses
The green-white varieties of Thai eggplants are essential ingredients in Thai curry dishes such as in kaeng tai pla, green and red curry. They are often halved or quartered, but can also be used whole, and cooked in the curry sauce where they become softer and absorb the flavor of the sauce. They are also eaten raw in Thai salads or with Thai chili pastes (nam phrik).

Sometimes, in Thai restaurants outside of Thailand, Thai eggplants are replaced by locally available eggplants.

One of the most popular Cambodian steak sauce known as Tuk Prahok is made with the green-white variety.

Gallery

See also
List of Thai ingredients
Solanum torvum for the pea-sized eggplants used in Thai cuisine; sometimes substituted by green peas outside of Thailand
Lao eggplant for common cultivar types in Laos such as Lao Green Stripe, Lao Purple Stripe, Lao Lavender, and Lao White
Vietnamese eggplant

References

Asian vegetables
Eggplants
Cultivars originating in Thailand